The Past Through Tomorrow is a collection of science fiction stories by American writer Robert A. Heinlein, first published in 1967, all part of his Future History.

Most of the stories are parts of a larger storyline about the future rapid collapse of sanity in the United States, followed by a theocratic dictatorship, a revolution, and the establishment of a free society that does not save the pseudo-immortal Lazarus Long and his Howard Families from fleeing Earth for their lives. Most editions of the collection include a timeline showing the chronology of the stories (including stories never written, such as "The Stone Pillow", which was to occur during the period of the theocracy), times of birth and death of the significant characters, and commentary by Heinlein.

The specific short stories included vary with the edition, but typically include:

 "Life-Line", 1939; a month before "Misfit" 
 "Misfit", 1939
 "The Roads Must Roll", 1940
 "Requiem", 1940
 If This Goes On—, 1940
 "Coventry", 1940
 "Blowups Happen", 1940
 "Universe", 1941
 "Methuselah's Children", 1941; extended and published as a novel, 1958
 "Logic of Empire", 1941
 "'—We Also Walk Dogs'", 1941
 "Space Jockey", 1947
 "'It's Great to Be Back!'", 1947
 "The Green Hills of Earth", 1947
 "Ordeal in Space", 1948
 "The Long Watch", 1948
 "Gentlemen, Be Seated!", 1948
 "The Black Pits of Luna", 1948
 "Delilah and the Space Rigger", 1949
 "The Man Who Sold the Moon", 1950
 "The Menace from Earth", 1957
 "Searchlight", 1962

The 1975 and 1986 paperback editions are both missing the story "Universe" (Orphans of the Sky), and likewise the 1967 hardback.

Reception
While regretting that several Future History stories Heinlein planned were never written, Algis Budrys praised the collection as "some of the finest writing [science fiction] has ever known". He described the book as "a magnificent compendium, coincidentally a rewarding and perhaps accurate cross-section of a writer's career", and required for any science fiction library. In February 1968 he named the book the "best publishing idea of the year".

References

External links
 
 

1967 short story collections
Short story collections by Robert A. Heinlein